Challenge is a British free-to-air television channel owned by Sky, a division of Comcast. The channel mostly transmits game shows from the UK and around the world, with some original productions.

History

The Family Channel

The channel was originally launched on 1 September 1993 as The Family Channel, a British version of the American cable network of the same name, owned by U.S. firm International Family Entertainment, a spin-off of the Christian Broadcasting Network's cable network The Family Channel, and the channel was timeshared with Children's Channel. Earlier in the year, IFE had acquired the assets of the defunct ITV franchise TVS for US$68.5 million (which included the MTM Enterprises library, and The Maidstone Studios), it was launched the same day as the UK and Ireland version of Nickelodeon, another American-based channel.

In June 1993, prior to its launch, IFE sold a 39% stake in the channel to Flextech. The Family Channel did produce some UK original programming, but heavily relied upon content from MTM and TVS's archives, and other U.S. imports. It was claimed that the channel produced more original series worldwide than any other cable or satellite network.

In April 1996, IFE sold its remaining 61% share to Flextech, giving them full ownership of the venture and production studio in Maidstone. The deal did not include any of the programme archive which included many TVS game shows, such as Catchphrase and All Clued Up, but the channel did continually broadcast these series until 2000.

Challenge TV (1997–2002) 
Flextech planned to relaunch the channel as The Challenge Channel during the autumn of 1996, with daytime targeted towards housewives, and evening and weekend programming focused on game shows. However, Flextech decided to delay the full relaunch of The Family Channel so it would not compete with the October 1996 launch of Granada Sky Broadcasting's suite of channels—which included the potential competitor Granada Good Life. Instead, The Family Channel began transitioning to the new brand by introducing a weekend game show strand known as Family Challenge Weekend.

On 3 February 1997, The Family Channel rebranded as Challenge TV, devoting the majority of its lineup to game shows. The channel was a primetime block from 17:00 to 00:30 with the overnight hours - 00:30 to 06:00 - branded as "Family Late", which continued to air its previous entertainment programming.

Challenge and Family Late shared its channel slot with The Children's Channel (which closed on Friday 3 April 1998) and later with TV Travel Shop.

At the end of 1998, Family Late ended, and in 1999, TV Travel Shop moved to a different transponder. Consequently, Challenge started to broadcast 24 hours a day, except on analogue cable services, where it continued to timeshare with TV Travel Shop.

Challenge?/Challenge
On 20 May 2002, Challenge TV renamed to Challenge? as it launched interactive services for Sky Digital customers.

On 30 June 2003, Challenge got new idents, Dices, Dices 2, Toaster, Cars, Jelly Cake, Kitchen, Supermarket & Dogs.

Beginning in mid-2003, Challenge began to focus on gambling-related programming. By May 2005, a dedicated gambling-themed block on the channel titled Player was introduced, which ran on the channel from 10:00 pm every night. The block expanded to its own channel on Thursday 2 March 2006, which instead became a sister channel to Bravo rather than one of Challenge. The spin-off channel lasted seven months before being rebranded as Bravo 2 on September 28 of that year.

In mid-2004, a timeshift channel called Challenge +1 launched on Sky Digital, and would later launch on Telewest and NTL.

On 1 November 2004, the channel temporarily rebranded with the Vox-Pops idents.

On 28 September 2006, the 2004 Vox-Pops idents were cancelled to make new 2006 idents including Orange and Blue, Dark Blue & Red.

On 3 June 2008, the channel began airing in 16:9 ratio and was rebranded. On 1 July 2008, a new sister channel called Challenge Jackpot was launched as a joint-venture between Virgin Media Television and Two Way Media. It was not available in Northern Ireland, Republic of Ireland or the Channel Islands due to "regulatory and legal restrictions". Games were overseen by Ofcom and the Alderney Gambling Control Commission.

Sky takeover
On 7 April 2009, Virgin Media, the then current owner, formally began the sale of its content operation. On 13 July 2010, Sky and Virgin Media announced that Sky had completed the acquisition of Virgin Media Television (VMtv) following regulatory approval in the Republic of Ireland.

In March 2010, with the announcement of the purchase of VIM by Sky, NetPlay TV (who acquired Two-Way Media in April 2009) terminated their agreement with VIM to run Challenge Jackpot, with the venture being fully sold to NetPlay. The dedicated channel was soon closed on Saturday 1 January 2011, and the Challenge Jackpot brand would be replaced with "Jackpot247" in September of that year.

The buyout led to some changes within the now-named Living TV Group. On 15 September, Sky announced to close Bravo, Bravo 2 and Channel One, which led to many of the programmes formerly running on the channel moving to other networks owned by Sky. Channel One's slot on Freeview would be replaced with Challenge, expanding the viewership of the channel, and making it free-to-air around the United Kingdom. On Tuesday 1 February 2011, Challenge replaced Channel One's Freeview space on the Freeview multiplex.

On 25 January 2011, it was confirmed that Total Nonstop Action Wrestling programming would start broadcasting on Challenge from 3 February 2011.

Challenge launched on the free-to-air satellite platform Freesat on Monday 3 December 2012.

On 7 October 2013, the channel went through a revamp, which included a new logo, and a set of animated characters, named the "Challengers", as idents to represent each type of show; such as Les Play for classics, Ellie for lighter physical shows or Cecil the Geek for science shows.

On 23 June 2016, the channel went through another revamp, discarding the "Challengers" and introducing a new logo which features a segmented C. The new idents for the channel work in elements of game shows that are broadcast by the channel including Deal or No Deal and Pointless, and include commercial bumpers which feature famous game show sayings such as Blockbusters ' "Can I have a P please, Bob?", Bullseye's "You can't beat a bit of Bully" and Robot Wars''' "3...2...1... Activate!" alongside the hashtag #ChallengeAccepted, which serves as the channel's tagline. Bumpers framing breaks  sometimes also include general knowledge questions or rebuses, referencing shows like Blockbusters and Catchphrase.

On 1 June 2020, Challenge +1 was closed on all platforms.

Programming

Challenge broadcasts gameshows from various decades and channels. Scheduling changes in 2015 onwards resulted in fewer gameshows being broadcast compared to previous decades. Examples of programmes currently shown on the channel are The Chase, Bullseye, Family Fortunes and Bruce's Price is Right.

Programming blocks
Challenge have had various programming blocks, for example, Fully Loaded!, a former morning programming block from around 2007 which consisted of Win, Lose or Draw, Wheel of Fortune, Catchphrase, Bullseye and Family Fortunes.

Other programming
Although the bulk of Challenge's schedule consists of game shows, the channel has also broadcast some other entertainment programming including the BBC blooper show Auntie's Bloomers from 2009 to 2011. Challenge was the UK rights holder for TNA Wrestling, airing Impact Wrestling, TNA Xplosion and delayed coverage of pay-per-view events, alongside original home-produced output for the channel, including BWC: British Wrestling Round-Up, Wrestle Talk TV and the reality series TNA British Boot Camp. As of January 2017, the station no longer airs any wrestling programming.

A gaming review show, Videogame Nation, also aired on Saturday mornings (originally Sundays). In August 2014, Challenge aired its first coverage of championship darts - delayed broadcasts of the PDC Sydney Masters.

In 2005, Challenge broadcast several gambling-related programmes as part of their short-lived "Player" block, such as the short lived CBS drama Dr. Vegas, along with the films Casino and Rounders''.

On 12 November 2020, Challenge broadcast football for the first time when it showed the Northern Ireland v Slovakia UEFA Euro 2020 playoff final match.

Irish station
An Irish feed of the station launched on Saorview on 1 February 2023. The Irish feed is the same as the UK feed, but features Irish advertising.

References

1993 establishments in the United Kingdom
English-language television stations in the United Kingdom
Quiz channels in the United Kingdom
Sky television channels
Television channels and stations established in 1993
Television channels in the United Kingdom